The Eolia 25 is a French trailerable sailboat that was designed by Philippe Briand as a coastal cruiser and first built in 1983.

Production
The design was built by Jeanneau in France from 1983 until 1989, with 1288 boats completed, but it is now out of production.

Design
The Eolia 25 is a recreational keelboat, built predominantly of single skin fiberglass polyester, with wood trim. It has a masthead sloop rig, with aluminum spars and wire standing rigging. It has a deck-stepped mast and a single set of unswept spreaders. The hull has a raked stem, a plumb transom, a transom-hung rudder controlled by a tiller and a fixed fin keel or, optionally a stub keel and centerboard. The fin keel version displaces  and carries  of cast iron ballast, while the stub keel and centerboard version displaces  and carries  of cast iron ballast, with a steel centerboard.

The fuel tank holds .

The design has sleeping accommodation for four people, with a double "V"-berth in the bow around a drop-down dinette table and an aft cabin with a double berth on the port side. The galley is located on the port side just forward of the companionway ladder. The galley is "L"-shaped and is equipped with a two-burner stove, a  icebox and a sink. A navigation station is opposite the galley, on the starboard side. The enclosed head is located just aft of the companionway on the starboard side.

Operational history
In a 2010 review Steve Henkel wrote, "the Jeanneau Eolia 25 was available either as a fin keeler (fixed draft 4' 9", shown here) or as a keel-centerboarder (draft 2' 7" board up, or 5' 11" board down). Although an outboard was an option, a high percentage of the boats sold have a raw-water-cooled Yanmar 1GM1O diesel of 7.5 hp. Either choice should power the Eolia 25 at hull speed. Best features: We think the layout is quite clever, with a double berth aft under the cockpit, an enclosed stand-up head in the highest location in the cabin, a modest-sized but practical nav station, and a U-shaped dining area seating up to 7 of 8 souls for that relaxing after-the-race beverage. The table slides down on the mast compression strut to
form the center portion of a double berth, The arrangement below makes the cabin seem quite airy and pleas-
ant, despite a too-small forward hatch and no opening ports, Worst features: We can't imagine why this boat has a PHRF rating 30 to 40 seconds a mile higher than her comp[etitor]s. We don't think she deserves such harsh treatment."

See also
List of sailing boat types

References

Keelboats
1980s sailboat type designs
Sailing yachts
Trailer sailers
Sailboat type designs by Philippe Briand
Sailboat types built by Jeanneau